Aedes is a genus of mosquitoes.
Aedes or Ædes or AeDES may also refer to:

 Aedes (Roman religion), in ancient Roman religion, a shrine or temple
 AeDES (engineering), Italian document re earthquake damage
 Ædes Danielis, building in Malta
 Aedes de Venustas, New York perfume store and perfume line